Marguerita Estell "Rita" Springer (born April 17, 1967) is an American Christian musician, who primarily plays a style of contemporary worship music and Christian pop music. She has released twelve studio albums, Love Covers (1995), All I Have (2000), Created to Worship (2001), Effortless (2002), Rise Up: Live Worship (2004), I Have to Believe (2005), Worth It All (2007), Beautiful You (2008), In This Forever (2011), The Playlist (2012), Battles (2017), and Light (2020).

Early life
Springer was born Marguerita Estell Springer on April 17, 1967, in Riverside County, California, while she would relocate frequently with her parents in her childhood. She is a single mother raising her adoptive child in Hurst, Texas.

Music career
Her music recording career started in 1995, with the first studio album being, Love Covers. While she has since released ten more studio albums, All I Have in 2000 with Floodgate Records, Created to Worship in 2001 with E1 Music, Effortless in 2002 with Word Records, Rise Up: Live Worship in 2004 with Floodgate Records, I Have to Believe in 2005 with Found Records, Worth It All in 2007 with Koch Records, Beautiful You in 2008 with E1 Music, In This Forever in 2011 with Integrity Music, The Playlist in 2012 with Integrity Music, and Battles in 2017 with Gateway Records.

Discography
Love Covers (1995, Independent)
All I Have (2000, Floodgate)
Created to Worship (2001, E1 Music)
Effortless (2002, Word)
Rise Up: Live Worship (2004, Floodgate)
I Have to Believe (2005, Found)
Worth It All (2007, Koch)
Beautiful You (2008, E1 Music)
In This Forever (2011, Integrity)
The Playlist (2012, Integrity)
Battles (2017, Gateway)

References

External links
 
 CMnexus Profile

1967 births
Living people
Musicians from California
Musicians from Texas
Songwriters from California
Songwriters from Texas
American performers of Christian music